Tommaso De Cristoforis was an Italian Lieutenant Colonel who was most notable for his command during the Battle of Dogali and was awarded the Gold Medal of Military Valor for his brave service.

Biography
He was born in Casale Monferrato on June 6, 1841, son of the lawyer Paolo De Cristoforis who was from a noble Lombard family, and of Antonia Manara, belonging to a family of illustrious Piedmontese jurists. After completing his studies at the high school of his hometown he entered the Royal Military Academy of Turin, from where he left in June 1859, assigned with the rank of second lieutenant to the 12th Infantry Regiment of the "Casale" Brigade. On October 26 of the following year he participated in a battle against the Bourbons at San Giuliano earning the Silver Medal of Military Valor. He participated in the Siege of Gaeta as aide-de-camp to General Efisio Cugia. In 1866 he participated in the Third Italian War of Independence as the official Staff General Enrico Cialdini , and subsequently transferred to the Division of Palermo , the stifling of revolt in the city.

Transferred to the 56th Regiment stationed in Turin, his military career took place in the city, reaching the rank of major on 8 November 1880 and, six years later, that of lieutenant colonel in the 93rd Infantry Regiment on May 20. On September 12, 1886 assumed command of III Battalion Infantry d'Africa of the Special Corps of Africa in Massawa, in Italian Eritrea.

Battle of Dogali
The Italo-Abyssinian relations had gradually become increasingly tense starting from 12 April 1886, when there was the massacre of the exploratory mission led by Count Gian Pietro Porro near Gildessa on the road from Zeila to Harar.

The Italian troops, then under the command of General Carlo Genè, occupied some positions in November 1886, including Saati, about 30 kilometers from Massawa and then Ua-à. On January 10, 1887, Ras Alula moved with about 10,000 men towards Saati, ordering General Genè to abandon the positions he had just conquered. Genè's response was negative, and he also began to reinforce the Italian positions of Saati and Uaà by sending a reserve column made up of about 700 men, under the command of De Cristoforis. On January 25, the Abyssinians, who had meanwhile left Ghinda, attacked the Italians, commanded by Major Boretti, who successfully resisted, but remained short of ammunition and provisions thus asking for help.

Organized by the Italian command the expedition, De Cristoforis managed to leave from nearby Moncullo at 4 am on January 26, collecting 548 soldiers from different companies and two machine guns. Arriving in the locality of Dogali after a four-hour march, the Italian column was intercepted by the Ethiopians and attacked. De Cristoforis, although seriously outnumbered, did not refuse the clash; he arranged the men on two hills joined by a slight depression, in a semicircle formation about 500 meters long, and accepted the fight. During the very hard and long battle, which caused heavy losses among the Abyssinians he sent two relay races to Moncullo, the first on foot and the second, when however the situation was already compromised, on horseback, to ask for support.

Due to the heavy losses Ras Alula ordered his men to try to circumvent the Italian positions, and the maneuver determined the decision of De Cristoforis to try to fall back in order to Moncullo. The Abyssinians managed to circumvent the Italian positions, which, with the machine guns jammed and practically exhausted, the ammunition were reduced to fight with the white weapon. The final assault launched by Ras Alula, strong of the clear numerical superiority, led the Italians to fight with the bayonet, and when the final outcome was evident De Cristoforis ordered the survivors to present their weapons in honor of the fallen, being killed shortly after in the course of a sword fight hit by opposing spears.

The rescue column, led by Captain Tarturro, arrived in the late afternoon and quickly collected the wounded survivors, returned to Moncullo. The ascertained Italian losses were of 23 officers and 423 soldiers and fallen "Basci bazuk", while the Abyssinian ones were of over a thousand dead and numerous wounded, including further deaths.

Awards
Gold Medal of Military Valor 

Silver Medal of Valor

Order of the Crown of Italy
Commemorative Medal of the Unity of Italy

References

Bibliography
Camillo Antona-Traversi, Sahati and Dogali: 25 and 26 January 1887, Rome, Pallotta Brothers Typography, 1887.
Luigi Goglia, Fabio Grassi, Italian Colonialism from Adua to the Empire, Bari, Editori Laterza, 1981.

1841 births
1887 deaths
People from Casale Monferrato
Recipients of the Silver Medal of Military Valor
Recipients of the Gold Medal of Military Valor
People of former Italian colonies
People of the Third Italian War of Independence
Members of the Expedition of the Thousand